The Annexation of Dadra and Nagar Haveli was the conflict in which the territories of Dadra and Nagar Haveli passed from Portuguese rule to independent rule, with Indian allegiance, in 1954.

Dadra and Nagar Haveli were small undefended Portuguese overseas territories, part of Portuguese India since 1779. The territories were enclaves, without any access to the sea, administered by the Portuguese Governor of the district of Damão.

After India attained independence in 1947, some residents, with the help of volunteers from left-wing organizations such as the United Front of Goans (UFG), the National Movement Liberation Organization (NMLO), the Goa People's Party (affiliated to Communist ideology), the Communist Party of India as well as right-wing organizations such as the Rashtriya Swayamsevak Sangh (RSS) and the Azad Gomantak Dal (AGD) occupied Dadra and Nagar Haveli in 1954 and displaced Portuguese rule. The territories were subsequently merged into the Indian Union in 1961.

Background 

After Indian independence in 1947, pro-India activists in the Portuguese Indian provinces, as well as Indians from other places, proposed removing Portuguese control of Goa, Daman, Diu, Dadra and Nagar Haveli and integrating them with India. This was in line with the ideology of Mahatma Gandhi, who had, before India's independence, affirmed that "Goa cannot be allowed to exist as a separate entity in opposition to the laws of the free State [of India]".

Appasaheb Karmalkar, a bank employee with the Goa government took the reins of the National Liberation Movement Organization (NLMO) for the control of Portuguese-ruled Indian territories. Simultaneously the Azad Gomantak Dal (AGD), led by Vishwanath Lavande, Dattatreya Deshpande, Prabhakar Sinari and Gole, along with volunteers of the Rashtriya Swayamsevak Sangh led by Raja Wakankar and Nana Kajrekar had been planning an armed assault on Dadra and Nagar Haveli. Wakankar and Kajrekar visited the area around Dadra and Nagar Haveli and Daman several times in 1953 to study the topography and to get acquainted with workers and leaders who were agitating for the merger of the Portuguese territory with India.

The National Movement Organisation (NMO), Azad Gomantak Dal (AGD) and RSS agreed to form a United Front for liberation of D & N, in April 1954. Raja Wakankar and Nana Kajrekar of RSS reported that Lavachha, a village in Union of India, which was situated in between Dadra And Nagar Haveli, which was separated from each other by 4 km belt of land, was the most suitable place for liberation operation

Separately, the Goa People's Party and the then- Communist Party of India had also been arming and mobilizing Warli Adivasis in the neighboring districts since the mid-40's. Com L.B. Dhangar, Roopji Kadu and 'Godutai' Godavari Parulekar led the Warli communists during the Dadra Nagar Haveli struggle against Portuguese colonialism, around the slogan of 'Land to the tiller!'

In April 1954 the NLMO, AGD and RSS agreed to form a United Front for invasion of Dadra and Nagar Haveli. At a meeting in Elphinstone garden, an armed assault was planned. Independently, another organization, United Front of Goans (UFG), also pursued similar plans.

On 21 July 1954, the Communist Party of India forced the Portuguese to retreat from Dadra, a small landlocked territory bordering Nagar Haveli under leaders like Francis Mascarenhas, Narayan Palekar, Parulekar, Vaz, Rodriguez, Cunha.

J.D. Nagarwala, DIG of the Special Reserve Police, which had been deployed along the territory, had been sympathetic with the separatists. He had himself visited the area often and advised the separatists on the next moves.

The Portuguese situation 
The situation all around Dadra and Nagar Haveli was controlled by Special Reserve Police (SRP) of the Government of India. Mr. J. D. Nagarwala DIG was in overall control of SRP with the purpose of checking and preventing the infiltration of military personnel and material from Goa to Nagar Aveli, via Damão and Dadra. The SRP also controlled the entry of civilians, to and from the Portuguese areas, by issuing permits, to stop the possibility of infiltration of undesirable persons, like workers and leaders of Communist Party. The Portuguese Chief of Police at Silvassa, Señ. Falcão, had a total Police force of 329 constables – out of which, 3 were at Dadra and 9 were at Naroly.

Dadra was surrounded from all sides by Indian territory and Naroly would get isolated by River Daman-Ganga during the Monsoon. So, it was decided, by the separatists, to take over Dadra and Naroly during Monsoon, in the month of July. And the takeover of Silvassa would be worked out after occupying Dadra and Naroly.

Invasion of Dadra 
Dadra had a total of 3 police officers to maintain law and security in the region. The UFG, led by Francis Mascarenhas, Viman Sardesai and others, attacked the police station of Dadra on the night of 22 July 1954, assassinating Aniceto Rosário, inspector at Dadra Police Station. There were 2 other police guards in the police station, who were overpowered by the UFG forces. The next morning, an Indian flag was hoisted to declare Dadra a free territory. A panchayat for Dadra was formed under the administration of Jayanti Bhai Desai.

Invasion of Naroly 
A total of 6 police officers were in charge of the security in the Naroly region, at that time. On 28 July some 20 to 25 RSS activists 
led by Wakankar and 8 to 10 AGD volunteer fighters led by Sinari crossed the Darotha river and reached Naroly and stormed the police station. The Chief, his constable and the other 4 Portuguese police officers were forced to surrender. Thus on 28 July 1954 Naroly was liberated from Portuguese rule. On 29 July a Panchayat for Naroli was established.

Invasion of Luhari 
On 30 July, close to 200,000 Indian Adivasi Communist protestors rallied on the Indian side of the Dadra Nagar Haveli borders. The small police force was unable to restrain them and a detachment charged into Luhari village. 35 other villages in the Daman-Ganga area were attacked by the Adivasi people on that day.

While the Indian troops were supportive of the liberation struggle, the Morarji Desai-led Congress government was wary of allowing Communists to lead the struggle. The CPI was the biggest national opposition party at the time and the union government was anxious to contain its sphere of influence. Top leaders, including Com. Roopji Kadu, were arrested from Silvassa and the Special Reserve Police was deployed at the borders to not allow Communist detachments to enter. Instead, it was the RSS that led the charge into the town of Silvassa, whom by now had made arrangements to receive 150 trained militants from Poona.

On 4 February 1948, the Indian government had banned the RSS due to its role in the assassination of Mahatma Gandhi. However, as per the statement to the Bombay Legislative Assembly on 14 September 1949 (Proceedings p2126) the Home Minister Morarji Desai admitted that the ban on RSS was no longer considered necessary and it was lifted unconditionally.

Invasion of Silvassa 
After Naroly had been captured, there were rumors that thousands of Warli communists as well as UFG fighters were planning an attack on Silvassa. The Portuguese police, under the leadership of Captain Virgílio Fidalgo, retreated to Silvassa, leaving only 5 officers to protect the village of Piparia – a village north of Silvassa, bordering the Indian village of Lavachha. The separatists led by volunteers of the RSS and the AGD took this opportunity, crossed the river and captured Piparia.

Captain Fidalgo was asked by the separatists (led by Karmalkar) to surrender, but as there was no response from the Administrator the separatists decided to march towards Silvassa. Two units were led by the RSS and the third was led by the AGD. All three units moved from three different directions to Silvassa. Fidalgo with 150 Police personnel fled south, to the village of Khanvel, leaving the separatists with no resistance as they entered Silvassa on 2 August. They then declared the territory of Dadra and Nagar Haveli independent. The RSS's Kajrekar was placed in charge of the unit, while the AGD's Lavande was put in charge of treasury.

Surrender of Captain Fidalgo
Rumors were circulating that Portuguese reinforcements were coming to Nagar Haveli from Goa via Daman, so Kajrekar immediately contacted Nagarwala and requested a wireless set to enable the separatists to keep in contact with the Indian SRP Headquarters. The wireless set obtained from the Indian SRP was installed in one of the houses by the riverside. Bandu Karkhanis, an RSS volunteer, who knew how to operate the wireless set was put in charge. He was under instructions that in case of an emergency, he should throw the set in the river, cross the river and take shelter in the Indian territory which was just nearby and protected by Indian SRP.

Captain Fidalgo who was moving deep in Nagar Haveli with his 150 men were constantly followed by the militants. While the Portuguese set up rearguard defenses on the river bank, the Indian volunteer forces crossed the flooded river with local ferries on 10 August, assaulting the Portuguese forces at Khanvel and forcing them to retreat. The Portuguese unit eventually surrendered to the SRP at Ulad (Udva) on 11 August 1954.

At a public meeting, Karmalkar was chosen as the first administrator of Dadra and Nagar Haveli.

Integration into India

The integration of Dadra and Nagar Haveli into India was not recognized by any other countries before 1974. In the decision of 12 April 1960 in the "Case Concerning Right of Passage Over Indian Territory", the International Court of Justice clearly stated that Portugal had sovereign rights over the territories of Dadra and Nagar Haveli but India had the right to deny passage to armed personnel of Portugal over Indian territories. The residents of the former colony requested the Government of India for administrative help. K.G. Badlani, an officer of the Indian Administrative Service (IAS) was sent as the administrator.

From 1954 to 1961, the territory was administered as Free Dadra and Nagar Haveli by a body called the Varishta Panchayat of Free Dadra and Nagar Haveli.

During the years the territories enjoyed de facto independence, mail from Dadra and Nagar Haveli was routed through the Indian town of Vapi close to the border. Initially, remaining stocks of stamps of Portuguese India were overprinted LIBERATED AREAS in two lines. A single revenue stamp was also issued by Free Dadra and Nagar Haveli.

In 1961 when Indian forces took over Goa, Daman, and Diu, Badlani was, for one day, designated the Prime Minister of Dadra and Nagar Haveli, so that, as Head of Government, he could sign an agreement with the Prime Minister of India, Jawaharlal Nehru, and formally merge Dadra and Nagar Haveli with the Republic of India. This was done by the Tenth Amendment of the Constitution of India.

The territory was only recognized as part of the Indian Union, together with all the other former Portuguese possessions, after the recognition of that fact by Portugal, after the Carnation Revolution of 1974. A treaty was signed on 31 December 1974 between India and Portugal on recognition of India's sovereignty over Goa, Daman, Diu, Dadra and Nagar Haveli.

Until 2006, Portugal continued to grant Portuguese citizenship to all natives of Dadra and Nagar Haveli who wished to have it. In that year, this was amended to include only those who had been born before 19 December 1961.

References

External links
Case Concerning Right of Passage Over Indian Territory

Annexation
Dadra and Nagar Haveli
Indian independence movement
1954 in India
1954 in Portugal
India–Portugal relations
Military history of India
Conflicts in 1954
July 1954 events in Asia
August 1954 events in Asia
Invasions by India
Communist Party of India